Siegfried Carl Alban Rumann (October 11, 1884 – February 14, 1967), billed as Sig Ruman and Sig Rumann, was a German-American character actor known for his portrayals of pompous and often stereotypically Teutonic officials or villains in more than 100 films.

Early years
Born in Hamburg, German Empire to Alban Julius Albrecht Ludwig Rumann and his wife, Caroline Margarethe Sophie Rumann on October 11, 1884, he studied electrical engineering, then began working as an actor and musician before serving with the Imperial German Army during World War I.  He resumed his acting career after the war. After emigrating to the United States in 1924, his acting career blossomed. Befriending playwright George S. Kaufman and theater critic Alexander Woollcott, he enjoyed success in many Broadway productions. His Broadway credits included Once There Was a Russian (1961), Lily of the Valley (1942), Eight Bells (1933), Alien Corn (1933), Grand Hotel (1930), Half Gods (1929), and The Channel Road (1929).

Film 

Ruman made his film debut in Lucky Boy (1929).
He became a favorite comic foil of the Marx Brothers, appearing in A Night at the Opera (1935), A Day at the Races (1937), and A Night in Casablanca (1946). His German accent and large stature kept him busy during World War II, playing sinister Nazi characters in a series of wartime thrillers.

During this period, he also appeared in several films by director Ernst Lubitsch, a fellow German émigré, including Ninotchka (1939), portraying a Russian, and in To Be or Not to Be (1942) as the pompous Nazi Colonel "Concentration-Camp Erhardt". He played the role of Professor Herman Von Reiter in Shining Victory (1941), an adaptation of an A. J. Cronin play. Ruman continued his trend of portraying over-the-top German characters later in his career for Lubitsch's protege Billy Wilder, in his films The Emperor Waltz (1948), and Stalag 17 (1953). Ruman's voice was dubbed over German actor Hubert Von Meyerinck's voice in Wilder's One, Two, Three (1961), and he had a cameo role in The Fortune Cookie (1966).

Around 1936, Ruman modified his screen name from Siegfried Rumann to Sig Ruman in an attempt to make it a little less German-sounding, as anti-German prejudice was rising at that time, just prior to the outbreak of the Second World War.

Despite declining health during the 1950s and 1960s, Ruman continued to appear in films and made many guest appearances on television. He guest-starred as pompous Broadway director Eric Von Bissell in the memorable 1965 episode of The Addams Family,  "My Fair Cousin Itt".

Death 
Ruman died of a heart attack on February 14, 1967, at his home in Julian, California at the age of 82.  He was buried in Julian Cemetery, San Diego County, California.

From his first marriage, to Else Rumann, he had a daughter named Senta.

Selected filmography

Lucky Boy (1928) as Bit Part (uncredited)
The Royal Box (1929) as Bailiff
All Quiet On The Western Front (1930, uncredited) 
The World Moves On (1934) as Baron von Gerhardt
Servants' Entrance (1934) as Hans Hansen
Marie Galante (1934) as Brogard
Under Pressure (1935) as Doctor
The Wedding Night (1935) as Mr. Jan Novak
Spring Tonic (1935) as Matt Conklin
The Farmer Takes a Wife (1935) as Blacksmith
A Night at the Opera (1935) as Herman Gottlieb
East of Java (1935) as Hans Muller
The Princess Comes Across (1936) as Detective Steindorf
The Bold Cabarello (1936) as Commandante Sebastian Golle
On the Avenue (1937) as Herr Hanfstangel
Seventh Heaven (1937) as Durand
Maytime (1937) as Fanchon
Thin Ice (1937) as Prime Minister Ulricht
Midnight Taxi (1937) as John B. Rudd
The Great Hospital Mystery (1937) as Dr. Taggert
This Is My Affair (1937) as Gus
A Day at the Races (1937) as Dr. Leopold X. Steinberg
Think Fast, Mr. Moto (1937) as Nicolas Marloff
Love Under Fire (1937) as General Montero
Lancer Spy (1937) as Lt. Col. Gottfried Hollen
Heidi (1937) as Police Captain
Nothing Sacred (1937) as Dr. Emil Eggelhoffer
Thank You, Mr. Moto (1937) as Colonel Tchernov
Paradise for Three (1938) as Mr. Bold
The Saint in New York (1938) as Hutch Rellin
I'll Give a Million (1938) as Anatole Primerose
Suez (1938) as Sergeant Pellerin
Girls on Probation (1938) as Roger Heath
The Great Waltz (1938) as Wertheimer
Honolulu (1939) as Psychiatrist
Never Say Die (1939) as Poppa Ingleborg
Confessions of a Nazi Spy (1939) as Krogman
Only Angels Have Wings (1939) as Dutchy
Ninotchka (1939) as Iranoff
Remember? (1939) as Dr. Schmidt
Dr. Ehrlich's Magic Bullet (1940) as Dr. Hans Wolfert
Outside the Three-Mile Limit (1940) as Van Cleve
I Was an Adventuress (1940) as Herr Protz
Four Sons (1940) as Newmann
Bitter Sweet (1940) as Herr Schlick
Comrade X (1940) as Emil Von Hofer
Victory (1940) as Mr. Schomberg
So Ends Our Night (1941) as Ammers
The Man Who Lost Himself (1941) as Dr. Simms
That Uncertain Feeling (1941) as Kafka
The Wagons Roll at Night (1941) as Hoffman the Great
Love Crazy (1941) as Dr. Wuthering
Shining Victory (1941) as Professor Herman Von Reiter
World Premiere (1941) as Franz von Bushmaster
This Woman Is Mine (1941) as John Jacob Astor
To Be or Not to Be (1942) as Colonel Ehrhardt
Remember Pearl Harbor (1942) as Dirk Van Hoorten
Crossroads (1942) as Dr. Alex Dubroc
Enemy Agents Meet Ellery Queen (1942) as Heinrich - Spy Leader
Berlin Correspondent (1942) as Dr. Dietrich
Desperate Journey (1942) as Preuss
China Girl (1942) as Jarubi
Tarzan Triumphs (1943) as German Sergeant
They Came to Blow Up America (1943) as Dr. Herman Holger
Sweet Rosie O'Grady (1943) as Joe Flugelman
Government Girl (1943) as Ambassador
The Song of Bernadette (1943) as Louis Bouriette
It Happened Tomorrow (1944) as Mr. Beckstein
The Hitler Gang (1944) as General von Hindenburg
Summer Storm (1944) as Kuzma
House of Frankenstein (1944) as Hussman
A Royal Scandal (1945) as Gen. Ronsky
Men in Her Diary (1945) as Mme. Irene
The Dolly Sisters (1945) as Ignatz Tsimmis
She Went to the Races (1945) as Dr. Gurke
A Night in Casablanca (1946) as Count Pfefferman alias Heinrich Stubel
Night and Day (1946) as Wilowski
Faithful in My Fashion (1946) as Professor Boris Riminoffsky
Mother Wore Tights (1947) as Papa
If You Knew Susie (1948) as Count Alexis
The Emperor Waltz (1948) as Dr. Zwieback
Give My Regards to Broadway (1948) as Arthur Dinkel
Border Incident (1949) as Hugo Wolfgang Ulrich
Father Is a Bachelor (1950) as Jericho Schlosser
On the Riviera (1951) as Gapeaux
The World in His Arms (1952) as General Ivan Vorashilov
O. Henry's Full House (1952) as Menkie (segment "The Gift of the Magi") (uncredited)
Ma and Pa Kettle on Vacation (1953) as Cyrus Kraft
Stalag 17 (1953) as Sgt. Johann Sebastian Schulz
Die Jungfrau auf dem Dach (1953) as Michael O'Neill
Houdini (1953) as Schultz
The Glenn Miller Story (1954) as Kranz
Living It Up (1954) as Dr. Emile Egelhofer
White Christmas (1954) as Landlord (uncredited)
3 Ring Circus (1954) as Colonel Fritz Schlitz
Carolina Cannonball (1955) as Stefan
Many Rivers to Cross (1955) as Spectacle Man
Spy Chasers (1955) as King Rako of Truania
The Wings of Eagles (1957) as Manager
The Errand Boy (1961) as Baron Elston Carteblanche
One, Two, Three (1961) as Count von Droste Schattenburg (voice, uncredited)
Robin and the 7 Hoods (1964) as Hammacher (uncredited)
36 Hours (1965) as German Guard
The Last of the Secret Agents? (1966) as Prof. Werner von Koenig
The Fortune Cookie (1966) as Professor Winterhalter
Way...Way Out (1966) as Russian Delegate

References

External links

 
 

1884 births
1967 deaths
Male actors from Hamburg
German male film actors
American male film actors
German Army personnel of World War I
German emigrants to the United States
20th-century American male actors
20th-century German male actors
People from Julian, California